Kheireddine Zetchi (born October 24, 1965) is an Algerian businessman, former football player and the president of the Algerian Football Federation 2017-2021

Biography 
He was born on 24 October 1965 in Bordj Bou Arréridj. He was president of Paradou AC from 1994.

He was elected as head of the Algerian Football Federation on 20 March 2017.

References 

1965 births
Living people